An  is a kind of dictionary or vocabulary of Sanskrit. Its purpose was to be used as a general guide for lexicography and word choice. Many of these works had been created in India. One of the oldest of them is the Abhidhana ratna - mala, of Halayudha Bhatta of the 7th century. The Abhidhana Chinta-mani of Hema-chandra, a celebrated Jaina writer of the 13th century, is often mentioned as among the best. 

The sixty-four kalas (fine arts and crafts) as mentioned by Ancient Indians include "Abhidhana kosa cando jnana" or the use of lexicography and meters as one of them.

References 
 "History of Sanskrit lexicography" by Madhukar M. Patkar. New Delhi: Munshiram Manoharlal, 1981

Sanskrit words and phrases
Lexicography